Castoramine is an alkaloid with the molecular formula C15H23NO2.

Natural occurrence 
It is a chemical constituent of castoreum.

References 

3-Furyl compounds
Quinolizidine alkaloids